South Korean singer Hyomin 5 fan meetings and 3 solo concerts since her solo debut in 2014.

Hyomin's first Tour "Allure Cosmo Tour" was planned to be held across East Asia starting from Hong Kong. The tour was meant to promote Hyomin's third mini-album Allure, however, the tour was postponed and thed then canceled due Performance licensing issues with venue owners.

In 2018, Hyomin held her first fan meeting in Tokyo, Japan followed by another in 2019, a third fan meeting was planned for 2020, but due to the spread of  COVID-19 Pandemic, the fan meeting was canceled.

In 2019, Hyomin became the first idol girl group member to sell-out a solo fan meeting in Vietnam attracting over 1,000 fans.

Concert tours

Canceled shows

One-off concerts

Fan meetings

Canceled shows

Award shows

Music festivals

Joint concerts and tours

TV shows and specials

Radio shows

References 

Hyomin